Ditcheat is a village and civil parish  south of Shepton Mallet, and  north-west of Castle Cary, in the Mendip district of Somerset, England. Besides the village, the parish has four hamlets: Wraxall, Lower Wraxall, Alhampton and Sutton.

History
In the Domesday Book of 1086, Ditcheat belonged to Glastonbury Abbey and contained 36 families. The parish of Ditcheat was part of the Whitstone Hundred.

It lies near the River Brue which is crossed by Ansford bridge which dates from 1823. Boulter's Bridge which spans the River Alham is of medieval origin and has been designated as a Scheduled Ancient Monument. The parish is close to the Roman Fosse Way.

The Manor House is a 17th-century manor house built by Sir Ralph Hopton.

Governance
The parish council has responsibility for local issues, including setting an annual precept (local rate) to cover the council’s operating costs and producing annual accounts for public scrutiny. The parish council evaluates local planning applications and works with the local police, district council officers, and neighbourhood watch groups on matters of crime, security, and traffic. The parish council's role also includes initiating projects for the maintenance and repair of parish facilities, as well as consulting with the district council on the maintenance, repair, and improvement of highways, drainage, footpaths, public transport, and street cleaning. Conservation matters (including trees and listed buildings) and environmental issues are also the responsibility of the council.

The village falls within the Non-metropolitan district of Mendip, which was formed on 1 April 1974 under the Local Government Act 1972, having previously been part of Shepton Mallet Rural District, who are responsible for local planning and building control, local roads, council housing, environmental health, markets and fairs, refuse collection and recycling, cemeteries and crematoria, leisure services, parks, and tourism.

Somerset County Council is responsible for running the largest and most expensive local services such as education, social services, libraries, main roads, public transport, policing and  fire services, trading standards, waste disposal and strategic planning.

It is also part of the Somerton and Frome  county constituency represented in the House of Commons of the Parliament of the United Kingdom. It elects one Member of Parliament (MP) by the first past the post system of election. It was part of the South West England constituency of the European Parliament prior to Britain leaving the European Union in January 2020, which elected seven MEPs using the d'Hondt method of party-list proportional representation.

Religious sites

The Church of St Mary Magdalene has 12th-century origins. It has been designated by English Heritage as a Grade I listed building.

The Abbey is a large house (formerly known as The Priory), built as the rectory by John Gunthorpe who was rector of Ditcheat, Dean of Wells and Lord Privy Seal, in 1473. The house was altered in 1667 for Christopher Coward; and given a new facade and rearranged internally in 1864–68, probably by James Piers St Aubyn for Rev. William Leir.  The exterior is now mostly his Victorian neo-Tudor; inside there are reused fragments and some original 15th- and 17th-century work – coffered ceilings and the arch-braced roof of the ‘chapel wing’ – but most of the elaborate Gothic work dates from the 1860s.

Priors Leigh on the Alhampton Road is a former chapel, now a private home.

Alhampton is served by Alhampton Chapel, a small mission church and tin tabernacle which was erected in 1892. Alhampton Chapel is under the auspices of St Mary Magdalene Church in Ditcheat, both of which form part of the Fosse Trinity Benefice.

Community facilities
There is a public house, called The Manor House Inn, dating from the 17th Century and which used to be owned by the lord of the manor.

Sport
Ditcheat is home to the stables operated by Paul Nicholls, trainer of Cheltenham Gold Cup-winning horses Kauto Star and Denman.

Notable people
William Alleine (1614–1677), minister

References

External links

 Parish website
 
 

Villages in Mendip District
Civil parishes in Somerset